The Child Thou Gavest Me is a 1921 American drama film directed by John M. Stahl and written by Chester L. Roberts. The film stars Barbara Castleton, Adele Farrington, Winter Hall, Lewis Stone, William Desmond, and Richard Headrick. The film was released on August 20, 1921, by Associated First National Pictures.

Plot
The film begins with a wedding. During the ceremony the bride's illegitimate child suddenly appears. The marriage is maintained on the outside, but within the couple the jealousy of the husband leads to strong conflicts.

Cast      
Barbara Castleton as Norma Huntley
Adele Farrington as Her Mother
Winter Hall as Her Father
Lewis Stone as Edward Berkeley
William Desmond as Tom Marshall
Richard Headrick as Bobby
Mary Elizabeth Forbes as Governess

References

External links

1921 films
1920s English-language films
Silent American drama films
1921 drama films
First National Pictures films
Films directed by John M. Stahl
American silent feature films
American black-and-white films
1920s American films